Samuel Horatio Moreton (1843–21 March 1921) was a notable New Zealand painter and signwriter, artist, explorer. He was born in London, England in about 1843.

References

1843 births
1921 deaths
New Zealand artists
New Zealand explorers
English emigrants to New Zealand